Argentina competed at the 2011 World Aquatics Championships in Shanghai, China between 16 and 31 July.

Open water swimming

Men

Women

Mixed

Swimming

Argentina qualified 7 swimmers.

Men

Women

Synchronised swimming

Argentina has qualified 3 athletes in synchronized swimming.

Women

Reserve
Lucina Simon

References

Nations at the 2011 World Aquatics Championships
2011
World Aquatics Championships